3-Isopropylmalate dehydrogenase  is an enzyme that is a part of the isopropylmalate dehydrogenase family, which catalyzes the chemical reactions:
(2R,3S)-3-isopropylmalate + NAD+  4-methyl-2-oxopentanoate + CO2 + NADH
(2R,3S)-3-isopropylmalate + NAD+  (2S)-2-isopropyl-3-oxosuccinate + H+ + NADH
(2S)-2-isopropyl-3-oxosuccinate + H+  4-methyl-2-oxopentanoate + CO2

References 

EC 1.1.1
NADPH-dependent enzymes
Enzymes of known structure